The Free State of Anhalt was formed after Joachim Ernst, Duke of Anhalt abdicated on 12 November 1918, ending the Duchy of Anhalt. It became a state of Germany under the Weimar Republic (1919–1933) and for most of that time it was led by politicians from the Social-Democratic Party of Germany (SPD). 

However, in May 1932, the Nazi Party won the Landtag election and formed a coalition government with its ally, the German National People's Party (DNVP). Following the Nazi seizure of power at the Reich level in 1933, Anhalt, along with all other German states, had its Landtag abolished and its state sovereignty transferred to the Reich government by the "Law on the Reconstruction of the Reich" of 30 January 1934. Though the state itself was not formally abolished, it was superseded in administrative importance by the Nazi Party Gau Magdeburg-Anhalt.

At the end of World War II, when Germany was divided into zones of occupation, Anhalt was merged with the bulk of the Prussian Province of Saxony to form the Soviet-administered German state of Saxony-Anhalt. This state was then dissolved in 1952 but reformed in 1990 after the reunification of Germany.

See also 
List of Ministers-President of Anhalt

References

External links 
 More statistical information
 Further historical details

States of the Weimar Republic
Free State of Anhalt
1918 establishments in Germany
1945 disestablishments in Germany
Free State